Polypropylene raffia, or PP raffia is a packaging material made from weaving ribbons of oriented polypropylene.  It is named after the raffia palm, which the packaging emulates to some extent. Polypropylene raffia is considered to be a "widely used material for atmospheric capture".

See also
Geotextile

References

Packaging materials